In enzymology, a deacetoxycephalosporin-C hydroxylase is an enzyme that catalyzes the chemical reaction

deacetoxycephalosporin C + 2-oxoglutarate + O2  deacetylcephalosporin C + succinate + CO2

The 3 substrates of this enzyme are deacetoxycephalosporin C, 2-oxoglutarate, and O2, whereas its 3 products are deacetylcephalosporin C, succinate, and CO2.

This enzyme belongs to the family of oxidoreductases, specifically those acting on paired donors, with O2 as oxidant and incorporation or reduction of oxygen. The oxygen incorporated need not be derived from O2 with 2-oxoglutarate as one donor, and incorporation of one atom o oxygen into each donor.  The systematic name of this enzyme class is deacetoxycephalosporin-C,2-oxoglutarate:oxygen oxidoreductase (3-hydroxylating). Other names in common use include deacetylcephalosporin C synthase, 3'-methylcephem hydroxylase, DACS, DAOC hydroxylase, and deacetoxycephalosporin C hydroxylase.  This enzyme participates in penicillin and cephalosporin biosynthesis.

References

 
 
 
 
 
 
 

EC 1.14.11
Enzymes of unknown structure